Charles Henry Voorhis (March 13, 1833 – April 15, 1896) was a lawyer and judge from New Jersey.

Biography
Voorhis was born in Hackensack, New Jersey. He attended district schools and graduated from Rutgers College in 1853. He moved to Jersey City, New Jersey, studied law and was admitted to the bar in 1856, commencing practice in Jersey City. He was a delegate to the 1864 Republican National Convention, was presiding judge of Bergen County, New Jersey in 1868 and 1869 and was one of the organizers of the Hackensack Improvement Commission in 1869 as well as of Hackensack Academy. Voorhis organized and served as the first president of the Hackensack Water Company in 1873. Voorhis was one of the founders of both the Bergen County National Bank and the Hackensack Savings Bank in 1868. Both banks failed in the late 1870s, causing losses of approximately $2 million. While Voorhis was indicted for the failure of the banks, he was ultimately acquitted.

He was elected a Republican to the United States House of Representatives in 1878, serving from 1879 to 1881, not being a candidate for reelection in 1880.

After leaving Congress, he resumed his former business pursuits. On April 15, 1896, he committed suicide in his office in downtown Jersey City, New Jersey. He was interred in Hackensack Cemetery in Hackensack, New Jersey.

See also 
John Van Voorhis
Henry Clay Van Voorhis

References

External links

1833 births
1896 deaths
American people of Dutch descent
American politicians who committed suicide
New Jersey state court judges
New Jersey lawyers
Rutgers University alumni
Politicians from Jersey City, New Jersey
Politicians from Hackensack, New Jersey
Suicides by firearm in New Jersey
Republican Party members of the United States House of Representatives from New Jersey
19th-century American politicians
19th-century American judges
19th-century American lawyers
1890s suicides